Rachenitsa Nunatak (‘Nunatak Rachenitsa’ \'nu-na-tak r&-che-'ni-tsa\) is the ridge 1.8 km long in south-north direction, with twin rocky heights extending 500 by 350 m with elevation 842 m, and 900 by 330 m with elevation 843 m respectively, situated in Nichols Snowfield, northern Alexander Island in Antarctica. The vicinity was visited on 2 February 1988 by the geological survey team of Christo Pimpirev and Borislav Kamenov (First Bulgarian Antarctic Expedition), and Philip Nell and Peter Marquis (British Antarctic Survey).

The feature is named after the Bulgarian folk dance Rachenitsa, in connection with the settlement of Rachenitsa in Southeastern Bulgaria.

Location

Maps
 British Antarctic Territory. Scale 1:200000 topographic map. DOS 610 – W 69 70. Tolworth, UK, 1971
 Antarctic Digital Database (ADD). Scale 1:250000 topographic map of Antarctica. Scientific Committee on Antarctic Research (SCAR). Since 1993, regularly upgraded and updated

Notes

References
 Bulgarian Antarctic Gazetteer. Antarctic Place-names Commission. (details in Bulgarian, basic data in English)
 Rachenitsa Nunatak. SCAR Composite Gazetteer of Antarctica

External links
 Rachenitsa Nunatak. Copernix satellite image

Nunataks of Alexander Island
Bulgaria and the Antarctic